Francis Wortley may refer to:

Francis Wortley of Wortley, High Sheriff of Derbyshire 1577, Custos Rotulorum of the West Riding of Yorkshire, 1579–1583
Sir Francis Wortley, 1st Baronet (1591–1652), poet and Royalist officer in the English Civil War
Sir Francis Wortley, 2nd Baronet (c. 1616–1665), of the Wortley baronets

See also
 Dragon of Wantley, a 1767 poem about Sir Francis Wortley